The 1937–38 FA Cup was the 63rd staging of the world's oldest football cup competition, the Football Association Challenge Cup, commonly known as the FA Cup. Preston North End won the competition for the second time, beating Huddersfield Town 1–0 after extra time in the final at Wembley.

Matches were scheduled to be played at the stadium of the team named first on the date specified for each round, which was always a Saturday. Some matches, however, might be rescheduled for other days if there were clashes with games for other competitions or the weather was inclement. If scores were level after 90 minutes had been played, a replay would take place at the stadium of the second-named team later the same week. If the replayed match was drawn further replays would be held until a winner was determined. If scores were level after 90 minutes had been played in a replay, a 30-minute period of extra time would be played.

Calendar

First round proper
At this stage 41 clubs from the Football League Third Division North and South joined the 25 non-league clubs having come through the qualifying rounds. Chester, Millwall and Notts County were given a bye to the Third Round. To make the number of matches up, non-league Dulwich Hamlet and Walthamstow Avenue were given byes to this round. 34 matches were scheduled to be played on Saturday, 27 November 1937. Nine were drawn and went to replays in the following midweek fixture, with one of these going to a second replay.

Second Round Proper
The matches were played on Saturday, 11 December 1937, with two matches postponed until the 15th. Four matches were drawn, with replays taking place in the following midweek fixture.

Third round proper
The 44 First and Second Division clubs entered the competition at this stage, along with  Chester, Millwall and Notts County. The matches were scheduled for Saturday, 8 January 1938. Seven matches were drawn and went to replays, with one of these requiring a second replay to settle the fixture.

Fourth Round Proper
The matches were scheduled for Saturday, 22 January 1938. Four games were drawn and went to replays.

Fifth Round Proper
The matches were scheduled for Saturday, 12 February 1938. There were two replays, of which one went to a second replay.

Sixth Round Proper
The four quarter-final ties were scheduled to be played on Saturday, 5 March 1938. There was one replay, in the Huddersfield Town–York City match.

Semi-finals
The semi-final matches were played on Saturday, 26 March 1938. Preston North End and Huddersfield Town won their matches to meet in the final at Wembley.

Final

The 1938 FA Cup Final was contested by Preston North End and Huddersfield Town at Wembley. Preston, losing finalists the previous year, won by a single goal. After 29 minutes of extra time it was still 0–0 and BBC commentator Thomas Woodrooffe said "if there's a goal scored now, I'll eat my hat". Seconds later, Preston were awarded a penalty, from which George Mutch scored the winning goal; Woodrooffe kept his promise.

Match details

See also
FA Cup Final Results 1872-

References
General
Official site; fixtures and results service at TheFA.com
1937-38 FA Cup at rssf.com
1937-38 FA Cup at soccerbase.com

Specific

FA Cup seasons
FA
Fa Cup, 1937-38